Anna Maria Bietti Sestieri  is a contemporary Italian archaeologist based at the Università del Salento whose research focuses on Italian prehistory.

Education and career
Bietti Sestieri received her undergraduate degree in Etruscology after studying at Rome under Massimo Pallottino from 1964 to 1966. In the early 1970s her work was funded by the award of several Macnamara fellowships. From 1974 onward she served as an archaeological specialist in Italian prehistory for the Soprintendenza Archeologica di Roma, directing major excavations during that time. From 2003 to 2009 she served as president of the Istituto Italiano di Preistoria e Protostoria and from 1995 to 2003 she was the Soprintendente archeologo dell’ Abruzzo. Since 2006 she has been a member of the department of European protohistory at the Università del Salento.

Research
Her record of publication on Italian prehistory is extensive and she has organized several major museum exhibitions.  She is best known for leading the excavations of the Iron Age necropolis of Osteria dell'Osa located to the east of Rome, Italy. She has excavated extensively in Italy, including major excavations at Osteria dell'Osa, Castiglione, and Fidenae, as well as excavations at Frattesina di Fratta Polesine (Rovigo), and Specchia Artanisi di Ugento.

Honours 
She received the Europa Prize from the Prehistoric Society in 1996. In 1993 she was elected as a Corresponding Member of the Archaeological Institute of America.

Publications

Books
 1992. The iron age community of Osteria dell'Osa : a study of socio-political development in central Tyrrhenian Italy. Cambridge University Press.  [Reviews: David Ridgway in Journal of Roman Archaeology
 1992. La necropoli laziale di Osteria dell'Osa 3 v. Rome: Edizioni Quasar. .
 1996. Protostoria: teoria e pratica. Rome: La Nuova Scientifica.
 2007. Bietti Sestieri, A.M., Ellen Macnamara; Duncan R Hook. Prehistoric metal artefacts from Italy (3500-720BC) in the British Museum. Research publication (British Museum), no. 159. London: The British Museum. .
 2010. L'Italia nell'età del bronzo e del ferro : dalle palafitte a Romolo (2200-700 a.C.). with CD-ROM. Rome: Carocci. .

Articles
  2008. "L’età del bronzo finale nella penisola italiana" Padusa 44, n.s:7-54.
 Bietti Sestieri, A.M., C. Giardino, M.A.Gorgoglione. 2010. "Metal finds at the Middle and Late Bronze Age settlement of Scoglio del Tonno (Taranto, Apulia): results of archaeometallurgical analyses" Trabajos de Prehistoria 67.2:457-68.

References

Italian archaeologists
Prehistorians
Living people
Academic staff of the University of Salento
Italian women archaeologists
20th-century archaeologists
21st-century archaeologists
Year of birth missing (living people)
Italian women non-fiction writers
20th-century Italian non-fiction writers
20th-century Italian women writers
21st-century Italian non-fiction writers
21st-century Italian women writers